Tututepec is a Mesoamerican archaeological site.  It is located in the lower Río Verde valley on the coast of Oaxaca that formed the nucleus of an extensive Mixtec state during the Late Postclassic period (ca. 12th to early 16th centuries). At its largest extent the site covered some 21.85 km2, and its political influence extended over an area of more than 25,000 km² of the neighbouring territory.

Its name in Mixtec is Yucu Dzaa.

Today, the site is occupied by the contemporary settlement of Villa de Tututepec de Melchor Ocampo, in the Mexican state of Oaxaca.

Notes

References

  

Mixtec sites